Victor Emmanuel Chapman (April 17, 1890 – June 24, 1916) was a French-American pilot remembered for his exploits during World War I. He was the first American pilot to die in the war.

Growing up
Chapman was born in New York City to essayist John Jay Chapman and Minna Timmins (who died in 1898). He and his father moved to France soon after. In France, Chapman obtained dual-citizen status as a French and US citizen.

His father remarried, to Elizabeth Chanler, a sister of William A. Chanler from the Astor family, when Chapman was a teenager around 16 years old. Chapman returned to the United States in his late teens to attend Fay School (Class of 1903), St Paul's School, Concord, NH, and Harvard University. After graduating, Chapman returned to Europe, spending time in France and in Germany.

Fighting in the war

When World War I broke out, his father and stepmother moved to London, England. However, Chapman decided to stay in France, joining the French Foreign Legion on August 30, 1914, and served in the 3rd March regiment of the Legion. He became friendly with four men during his days on the trenches: a Polish fighter who was known only as "Kohl", and Americans Alan Seeger, Henry Fansworth, and David King. The trio of Americans watched as Kohl was killed by a bullet while walking with his friends. He was also friends with Edmond Genet.  

After Kohl's death, Chapman and two other friends, (Norman Prince and Elliot Cowdin), were given an opportunity to fly in a fighter airplane. Chapman requested a transfer to the Aéronautique Militaire, the army's air arm. He attended flight school and was certified as a pilot.

Chapman flew many missions for the 1st Aviation Group and was promoted to sergeant. He was chosen as one of the founding members of N.124, the Escadrille Americaine, also known as the Lafayette Escadrille. On June 17, 1916, he was flying over the Verdun sector when he was attacked by four German airplanes. During the engagement, Chapman suffered a head wound, most likely from an attack by then four-victory German flier Walter Höhndorf. Chapman landed his airplane safely, with Höhndorf getting his fifth victory as a result. While recovering Chapman found out that his friend, Clyde Balsley had been wounded in a separate incident. Prior to his last flight Chapman loaded oranges onto his aircraft, intending to take these to Balsley who was in the hospital recuperating from his wounds.   Chapman was attacked north of Douaumont by German flying ace Leutnant Kurt Wintgens, a close friend of Höhndorf. With Wintgens flying a Halberstadt D.II that day against Chapman's 
Nieuport 11, Wintgens soon gained the upper hand.

A memorial service was held on the 4th of July for Chapman. The service, which was held at the American Church in Paris, included many of the American ambassador to France, American residents of Paris and any American soldiers in France that could make it.

Awards and medals
Chapman earned many medals and commendations during his military career. Chapman was interested in the arts and in writing. He often found inspiration to write while he was in the middle of battles, and many of the letters he sent to his father were written in these circumstances. A book of these letters, called Letters from France, was published after his death. In his memory, the composer Charles Martin Loeffler, a friend of Chapman's father, composed his quartet Music for Four Stringed Instruments. A cenotaph in his honor was erected in St. Matthew's Episcopal Churchyard, Bedford, New York.

Bibliography

References

 Guttman, Jon Nieuport (2006). Flyers of the Lafayette, Albatros Productions, 

1890s births
1916 deaths
Military personnel from New York City
Harvard University alumni
Aviators killed by being shot down
Aviators from New York (state)
Soldiers of the French Foreign Legion
French military personnel killed in World War I
American military personnel killed in World War I
Fay School alumni
Livingston family
Jay family
Schuyler family